Tourouvre is a former commune in the Orne department in north-western France. On 1 January 2016, it was merged into the new commune of Tourouvre au Perche.

The first photovoltaic road in the world was under construction in Tourouvre in November–December 2016. It was built by Société Nouvelle Aeracem (SNA), and dedicated by the French Minister of Ecology, Ségolène Royal on 25 October 2016.  In 2019, Le Monde declared the experiment a failure.

Heraldry

See also
Communes of the Orne department
 Perche

References

Former communes of Orne
Perche